Maurits Rudolph Joël Dekker (16 July 1896, in Amsterdam – 7 October 1962) was a Dutch novelist and playwright.

He was the son of Joël Dekker, a Jewish merchant and house painter, and Betje Turksma, a nurse.

Honors and awards

 1949 Prize of the Society Kunstenaarsverzet
 1955 Marianne Philips Prize
 1956 Special Award from the Jan Campert Society for his works
 1956 Literary Prize of City of Amsterdam for Op zwart stramien

References

External links
 Biography in Dutch

1896 births
1962 deaths
Dutch Jews
Dutch male novelists
Writers from Amsterdam
20th-century Dutch novelists
20th-century Dutch male writers
20th-century Dutch dramatists and playwrights
Dutch male dramatists and playwrights